Tropidonophis aenigmaticus, the East Papuan keelback, is a species of colubrid snake. It is found on Fergusson Island in Papua New Guinea.

References

Tropidonophis
Reptiles of Papua New Guinea
Snakes of New Guinea
Reptiles described in 1988